Surya Brasil is a privately held company based in Brazil (with offices in Sao Paulo, New York City and India) that sells natural cosmetics.

Introduction
Surya Brasil was founded in 1995 in Brazil by Clelia Cecilia Angelon and began distributing product in the United States in 1997.

Awards
The company's Henna Brasil Cream has won the Better Nutrition Best of Natural Beauty Award for 2009 and 2010.

References

External links
 

Companies based in São Paulo
Chemical companies established in 1995
Cosmetics companies of Brazil
Brazilian brands
Cosmetics brands